The 2017 New Scotland Clothing Ladies Cashspiel was held October 6 to 9 at the CFB Curling Club in Halifax, Nova Scotia as part of the 2017-18 World Curling Tour.

Teams 

The teams are listed as follows:

Round-robin standings

Playoffs

References

2017 in women's curling
2017 in Canadian curling
Women's curling competitions in Canada
Curling competitions in Halifax, Nova Scotia
2017 in Nova Scotia
October 2017 sports events in Canada
21st century in Halifax, Nova Scotia